Catarman, officially the Municipality of Catarman,  is a 5th class municipality in the province of Camiguin, Philippines. According to the 2020 census, it has a population of 17,569 people.

Etymology
The town got its name from the Cebuano word katadman which means point or cape.

Geography

Climate

Barangays
Catarman is politically subdivided into 14 barangays.
 Alga
 Bonbon
 Bura
 Catibac
 Compol
 Lawigan
 Liloan
 Looc
 Mainit
 Manduao
 Panghiawan
 Poblacion
 Santo Niño
 Tangaro

Demographics

Economy

Tourism
Some of the famous tourist spot in Camiguin is the hot spring located in Mambajao, Camiguin. Cold spring located in Catarman, Camiguin and soda water in Bora, Catarman.

References

External links

 [ Philippine Standard Geographic Code]
Philippine Census Information

Municipalities of Camiguin